Jadwigów may refer to the following places:
Jadwigów, Łódź Voivodeship (central Poland)
Jadwigów, Opatów County in Świętokrzyskie Voivodeship (south-central Poland)
Jadwigów, Włoszczowa County in Świętokrzyskie Voivodeship (south-central Poland)
Jadwigów, Białobrzegi County in Masovian Voivodeship (east-central Poland)
Jadwigów, Grójec County in Masovian Voivodeship (east-central Poland)
Jadwigów, Płock County in Masovian Voivodeship (east-central Poland)
Jadwigów, Greater Poland Voivodeship (west-central Poland)